Sumazau is a traditional folk dance that is popular in Sabah and throughout Malaysia. It is a traditional dance of the Kadazan Dusun. It is often performed during the harvest festival celebration every May.

Sumazau is performed in traditional black and red clothing. It is played to the accompaniment of eagles; usually six gongs of various sizes, and a drum with a unique rhythm. The duration and rhythm of Sumazau varies by region and country.

This is a dance inspired by eagles flying patterns witnessed by farmers resting in the fields during the harvest season. During the dance, each dancer must make a sequence of moves only a few centimeters away from each other without touching.

References

Dances of Malaysia